The yellow-sided flowerpecker (Dicaeum aureolimbatum) is a species of bird in the family Dicaeidae.
It is endemic to Sulawesi and adjacent islands in Indonesia.

Its natural habitats are subtropical or tropical moist lowland forest and subtropical or tropical moist montane forest.

Gallery

References

Endemic birds of Sulawesi
Dicaeum
Birds described in 1865
Taxonomy articles created by Polbot